The Milton-Myers American Legion Post No. 65 is a historic site in Delray Beach, Florida, United States. It is located at 263 Northeast 5th Avenue. On April 20, 1995, it was added to the U.S. National Register of Historic Places.

The Milton-Meyers Post was chartered by the American Legion in 1920.

References

External links
 Palm Beach County listings at National Register of Historic Places
 Milton Myers American Legion Post #65 at Florida's Office of Cultural and Historical Programs

Delray Beach, Florida
National Register of Historic Places in Palm Beach County, Florida
American Legion buildings
Mission Revival architecture in Florida
Clubhouses in Florida
Clubhouses on the National Register of Historic Places in Florida